The Ministry of Irrigation is the cabinet ministry of the Government of Sri Lanka  responsible for:
The development of the nation's water resources and irrigation infrastructure
The management of river basins, groundwater sources and irrigation systems  a by operation and/or maintenance
Conservation and protection of sources of water (groundwater included), including monitoring pollution levels and ensuring water quality, as well as preventing salt water intrusions into fresh water sources
Allocation of water resource use at a national level (not to be confused with the more in-depth functions of the National Water Supply and Drainage Board)
Maintaining national drainage networks and flood protection systems
Engineering consultancy services
Oversight and promotion of rainwater harvesting.
To this end, the ministry drafts policies and legislation, as well as provides guidelines, advice and consultancy.

List of ministers

Parties

See also
 List of ministries of Sri Lanka
 Geography of Sri Lanka
 List of rivers of Sri Lanka
 List of dams and reservoirs in Sri Lanka
 Agriculture in Sri Lanka

References

External links
 Ministry of Irrigation and Water Resources Management
 Government of Sri Lanka

Irrigation
Irrigation